Thimmarajupally is a village located in Kadapa district, Andhra Pradesh, India.

The village consists of nearly one hundred families. The area is primarily agricultural, with villagers growing rice and sunflower.

References

Villages in Kadapa district